J. (Jay) W. Carney Jr. is an American criminal defense attorney. Carney has defended reproductive health clinic shooter John Salvi, Al-Qaeda associate Tarek Mehanna, and mobster Whitey Bulger.

Career 
Carney began his legal career in 1978 at the Massachusetts Defenders Committee in Boston for five years and then served as a prosecutor in Middlesex County for the next five years. He has been in private practice since 1989.

References

External links
 
 

Living people
Criminal defense lawyers
Massachusetts lawyers
Year of birth missing (living people)